Cacyparis elegans is a moth species in the genus Cacyparis first described by Arthur Gardiner Butler in 1887. It is found in the Solomon Islands.

References 

Nolidae
Moths described in 1887